The 1998–99 FIBA EuroLeague was the 42nd installment of the European top-tier level professional club competition for basketball clubs (now called simply EuroLeague). It began on September 23, 1998, and ended on April 22, 1999. The competition's Final Four was held at Olympiahalle, Munich, with Žalgiris defeating Kinder Bologna in the EuroLeague Final, in front of 9,000 spectators.

Competition system
24 teams (the national domestic league champions from the best leagues, and a variable number of other clubs from the most important national domestic leagues). The competition culminated in a Final Four.

Teams

Country ranking
For the 1998–1999 EuroLeague, the countries are allocated places according to their place on the FIBA country rankings, which takes into account their performance in European competitions from 1995–96 to 1997–98.

First round

Second round
(The individual scores and standings of the First round are accumulated in the Second round)

If one or more clubs are level on won-lost record, tiebreakers are applied in the following order:
Head-to-head record in matches between the tied clubs
Overall point difference in games between the tied clubs
Overall point difference in all group matches (first tiebreaker if tied clubs are not in the same group)
Points scored in all group matches
Sum of quotients of points scored and points allowed in each group match

Top 16

|}

Quarterfinals

|}

Final four

Semifinals
April 20, Olympiahalle, Munich

|}

3rd place game
April 22, Olympiahalle, Munich

|}

Final
April 22, Olympiahalle, Munich

|}

Final standings

Awards

FIBA EuroLeague Top Scorer
 İbrahim Kutluay ( Fenerbahçe)

FIBA EuroLeague Final Four MVP
 Tyus Edney ( Žalgiris Kaunas)

FIBA EuroLeague Finals Top Scorer
 Antoine Rigaudeau (Virtus Bologna)

FIBA EuroLeague All-Final Four Team

References

External links
1998–99 FIBA EuroLeague
1998–99 FIBA EuroLeague
Eurobasket.com 1998–99 FIBA EuroLeague

 
EuroLeague seasons